Neyyar dam is a gravity dam on the Neyyar River in Thiruvananthapuram district of Kerala, South India, located on the foot of the Western Ghats about 30 km from Thiruvananthapuram. It was established in 1958 and is a popular picnic spot.

History
Neyyar 2nd State (relates to both Madras and Kerala States) Government of Kerala started work on the project in their area in October 1956.

Design
One of the contractors who built the Neyyar Dam was Mr Jagathy Chellappan Contractor of Jagathy, Trivandrum.

Wildlife

Wild life includes Gaur, Sloth bear, Nilgiri Tahr, Jungle cat, Nilgiri langur, Wild elephants and Sambar deer.

Activities

Yoga
Neyyar Dam is home to the Sivananda Yoga Vedanta Dhanwanthari Ashram where people can take courses in yoga and practice meditation. The trees that are growing inside the ashram are large due to care by the people.

Boating
Tourists can hire a speed boat for Rs 250 per head to view the surrounding forests.

Crocodile Rehabilitation and Research Centre
A crocodile farm was set up in 1977. It also includes a habitat for otters near the administrative complex. The Crocodile Rehabilitation and Research Centre in Neyyar Wildlife Sanctuary was named initially by the Kerala government after the late naturalist Steve Irwin as Steve Irwin National Park.

Attractions
 Lion safari park (Not open anymore due to the lions not breeding)
 Boating
 Deer park
 Crocodile Rehabilitation and Research Centre
 Miniature wild life sanctuary
 Lake garden
 Swimming pool
 Watch tower
 Elephant riding

Transport
The nearest airport is Thiruvananthapuram International Airport, 38 km away, and the nearest railway station is at Thiruvananthapuram, 30 km away.

References

Dams in Kerala
Reservoirs in Kerala
Tourist attractions in Thiruvananthapuram district
Dams completed in 1958
1958 establishments in Kerala
20th-century architecture in India